"Opening Day" is the third and final segment of the tenth episode from the first season (1985–86) of the television series The Twilight Zone. In this segment, a man plots to kill his lover's husband so he can marry her, but steps into an altered reality where his role seems to be swapped with that of his victim.

Plot
During a party, a wealthy socialite named Sally Wilkerson coaxes her lover Joe Farrell to murder her husband Carl during a duck hunt planned for the next morning. Joe has reservations because he has never killed anyone before and Carl is his friend, but Sally says this is the only way they can be together.

During the hunt, Carl tells Joe how much he appreciates his friendship. When Carl turns to shoot at some ducks, Joe slams his rifle butt into Carl's head, knocking him into the lake. Joe repeatedly hits Carl until he is dead. The police arrive. Joe tells them that Carl was knocked into the water by his rifle's recoil, and that he unsuccessfully tried to help him out by extending his rifle to him as a handhold.

When he returns to Sally and Carl's house, two kids enter and call Joe "Daddy." Sally, too, treats him as her husband. At first, Joe is somewhat mystified but delighted in this change to reality. However, after he sees Carl at a party, still alive, Joe begins to realize he is reliving the events leading up to the duck shoot but with his place and Carl's place swapped. He accuses Sally of having an affair with Carl, recounting the details of their own love affair from the original reality, under the assumption that the same things would have happened between her and Carl in this reality. Sally appears shocked and adamantly denies the affair, but he chalks this up to her being a good actress.

Expecting Carl to try to kill him during the duck hunt, Joe attempts to preemptively knock him into the lake, but loses his balance and falls in. Carl extends his rifle as a handhold, but still thinking Carl wants to kill him, Joe doesn't take it and drowns. The altered reality then merges back to the original reality: Carl is again Sally's husband, and Sally and Joe plotted his murder, but it ended with Joe's death instead. Carl tells Sally what happened, and she comforts Carl, concealing her disappointment at his survival.

External links
 
 Postcards from the Zone episode 1.25 Opening Day

1985 American television episodes
The Twilight Zone (1985 TV series season 1) episodes
Hunting in popular culture

fr:Chasse ouverte